Edna Karr High School is a public, open enrollment, coeducational charter school in New Orleans, Louisiana, United States.  The school is a college preparatory high school and is a part of InspireNOLA Charter Schools and the New Orleans Public School System (NOPS). Edna Karr High School is located in Algiers, a small community of New Orleans located on the west bank of the Mississippi River in Orleans Parish.

History
The school began operation in 1964 as a junior high school. It was named after Edna Karr, an educator who served as a teacher and administrator in the Algiers community. About 18 months after the (mid-school-year) opening of the new junior high, Hurricane Betsy struck as the 1965-66 school year was starting. Local schools were closed for several days, in part because local electric power had not been restored. In addition, Karr's beautiful gym floor was ruined; blowing rain had pounded in through broken windows, and the inundated wood flooring buckled like an accordion. When school restarted, physical education classes were held outdoors until the floor had been replaced.

Until 1990, Edna Karr operated as a typical junior high serving grades 7 through 9, with an academic program that included regular education, special education, and gifted education. In 1990 the Orleans Parish School Board voted to change Edna Karr into a junior/senior high magnet school. This was at the behest of community activists. As a result, significant changes took place: upper grade levels, new courses, and high school traditions were added. In addition, policies and procedures were written for magnet school clientele. In the years since 1990, Karr completed its Southern Association of Colleges and Schools (SACS) 10-Year Update in 1998. In 2000 and again in 2005, Edna Karr earned the National Blue Ribbon Schools of Excellence Recognition.

All of this changed in the autumn of 2005 after Hurricane Katrina. With the creation of the Algiers Charter Schools Association, Edna Karr was one of the first six public schools to reopen in the city of New Orleans (December 15, 2005). Edna Karr reopened as a senior high charter school serving grades 9 through 12. Under the ACSA charter, Edna Karr once again has open enrollment and is therefore open to all students who live in Orleans Parish.

Edna Karr will complete a brand new campus by October 2019.  The project is estimated to cost $48.9 million.

Student demographics 
As of the 2015-16 school year, approximately 95% of the student population is African-American, and approximately 83% of the students qualify for free or reduced-price school lunches. Most of the students will be first-generation college students in their families.

In 2015, Edna Karr ranked 2nd best in the New Orleans Parish School District and above 83.1% of high schools in Louisiana in academic performance.

Athletics
Edna Karr athletics competes in the LHSAA.

State Championships
(6) Football: 1993, 2012, 2016, 2017, 2018, 2019

Marching band 
Edna Karr's marching band is known as “#TeamBustEmUp" includes 100+ instrumentalists, dancers (Cougar Dolls), a flag corp, and twirlers.  Some notable accomplishments of the band includes being highlighted in a documentary on New Orleans, photographed for the ESPN's 10th Anniversary of Hurricane Katrina issue, invited to perform in London, England for the city's 2016 New Years Day  Parade, and a cameo appearance in Beyoncé's Lemonade visual album. They have also appeared in a 2018 T-Mobile commercial. The band also has made an appearance in the 2018 film, “Assassination Nation”. It is one of the premier bands of New Orleans, often called upon to compete nationwide.

The Marching Cougars' motto is "Second to None".

Notable people
 Patricia Clarkson (class of 1977), television and film actress (Six Feet Under, The Green Mile, Far from Heaven, Pieces of April, The Station Agent)
 Greg "Tarzan" Davis (class of 2011), television and film actor (Top Gun: Maverick, Grey's Anatomy, Mission: Impossible – Dead Reckoning Part One, Tales from the Hood 2)
 Olaf Fink, state senator for Algiers from 1956 to 1972, also a teacher during that time, including at Edna Karr
 Eric Henderson, (class of 2001), Georgia Tech and NFL defensive end
 Cornelius Lucas, (class of 2010), NFL football player
 Racey McMath (class of 2017), NFL football player
 Bernard Robertson, (class of 1996), NFL offensive tackle
 Robert Royal (class of 1997), NFL tight end
 David P. Steiner (class of 1978), CEO Waste Management
 Patrick Surtain (class of 1994), NFL cornerback
 Gerald Willis (class of 2014), NFL football player

References

External links

 EdnaKarr.org

Charter schools in New Orleans
Public high schools in New Orleans
Magnet schools in Louisiana
Educational institutions established in 1964
1964 establishments in Louisiana